The men's long jump event at the 2015 Military World Games was held on 5 and 6 October at the KAFAC Sports Complex.

Records
Prior to this competition, the existing world and CISM record were as follows:

Schedule

Medalists

Results

Qualification
Qualification: 7.75 m (Q) or at least 12 best (q) qualified for the final.

Final

References

long jump